Jedidiah Preble (1707–1784) was Captain of Infantry in Samuel Waldo's Regiment, whom he brought land from and settled in Falmouth, Maine (present-day Portland, Maine).  He served in the Siege of Louisbourg (1745).  He also fought in the Battle of Grand Pre (1747).  He accompanied John Winslow on his expedition up the Kennebec River and participated with him the following year in the Battle of Fort Beauséjour (1755) where he was wounded.  He then participated in the Cape Sable Campaign, part of the expulsion of the Acadians. After the British took control of the Saint John River, they took control of the final river the Penobscot.  Preble became commander at the newly built Fort Point (formally Fort Pownal) on the Penobscot River (1759).  He was also active in the American Revolution.

He was the father of Edward Preble, after whom Preble Street in Portland and Fort Preble in South Portland are named.

References

Sources

   George Henry Preble.  Brigadier General Jedidiah Preble and his descendants. Boston. 1868 
Letters of Preble
 Preble letter re: Mowatt
 Bell, Winthrop Pickard. Brigadier General Jedidiah Preble (1707-1784) and his participation in Nova Scotia history.  Halifax, N.S. : Halcraft Printing, 1954., 39 p

People of Father Le Loutre's War
1707 births
1784 deaths
British America army officers
People from York, Maine